The Staffelegg Formation (German: Staffelegg-Formation, French: Formation de la Staffelegg, Italian: Formazione della Staffelegg) is a formation of Early Jurassic age (late Hettangian to early Toarcian stages) in the Canton of Aargau of northern Switzerland. The siltstones, marls, limestones and intermittent sandstones of the formation were deposited on the Northern Tethyan Carbonate Platform (NTCP). The Staffelegg Formation has provided fossils of the ichthyosaur Eurhinosaurus longirostris and the ammonite Catacoeloceras raquinianum.

Description 
The Staffelegg Formation is named after the Staffelegg Pass, overlies the Keuper Group and is overlain by the Opalinus Clay. The formation comprises siltstones and marls. Additionally, limestones and subordinately also sandstones may occur especially in the Sinemurian part. In the Folded Jura, these sediments may make up the major portion of the Staffelegg Formation. Facies changes may occur within short distances in the Folded Jura. The Staffelegg Formation displays a small thickness compared to the occurrences of the Early Jurassic of southeastern France and southwestern Germany. A gradual decrease in thickness can be detected which continues from southwestern Germany into northern Switzerland.

Formerly, the formation was considered part of the Posidonia Shale, until it was defined as a separate formation by Reisdorf et al. in 2011.

The formation was deposited on the Northern Tethyan Carbonate Platform. The Staffelegg Formation dates from the late Hettangian to early Toarcian.

Subdivision 
The Staffelegg Formation is subdivided into:

 Gross Wolf Member
 Rietheim Member
 Rickenbach Member
 Breitenmatt Member
 Grünschholz Member
 Frick Member
 Fasiswald Member
 Membre du Mont Terri
 Weissenstein Member
 Beggingen Member
 Schambelen Member

Fossil content 
Among others, the following fossils have been reported from the formation:

Reptiles 

Ichthyosaurs
 Eurhinosaurus longirostris

Invertebrates 
Ammonites
 Catacoeloceras raquinianum

References

Bibliography

Further reading 

 

Geologic formations of Switzerland
Jurassic System of Europe
Jurassic Switzerland
Hettangian Stage
Pliensbachian Stage
Toarcian Stage
Limestone formations
Shallow marine deposits
Paleontology in Switzerland
Formations